The Merrimack Formation is a geologic formation in Quebec. It preserves fossils dating back to the Silurian period.

Fossil content

See also

 List of fossiliferous stratigraphic units in Quebec

References

 

Silurian Quebec
Silurian southern paleotropical deposits